Chamek (Jawi: چمق) is a village in Kluang District, Johor, Malaysia. The name originated from the Chinese variation of the word Jambi, which is rather hard to pronounce.

The village is a multiracial village, having all Chinese, Malays and Indians. Mostly, the Malays are of the Javanese descendants, and they practiced the Javanese culture in their everyday life. The populations mainly work in rubber plantation, palm plantation, and a few opened grocery stores.

The village is located nearer to a small town of Paloh, where the public amenities, such as post office, health center, and police station are more available.

Transportation
The town was served by Chamek Railway Station of Keretapi Tanah Melayu. The station was closed permanently on 7 September 2020 due to the Gemas-Johor Bahru electrification and double tracking project.

 

Kluang District
Villages in Johor